Catocala californica is a moth of the family Erebidae first described by William Henry Edwards in 1864. It is found in western North America from British Columbia and Alberta south through Washington and Oregon to California.

The wingspan is about 65 mm. Adults are on wing from June to August depending on the location.

The larvae feed on Juglans nigra and Salix species.

Subspecies
Former subspecies Catocala californica edwardsi and Catocala californica elizabeth are now considered synonyms.

References

External links

"Catocala californica W.H. Edwards, 1864". The Catocala Website. Archived May 12, 2008.

californica
Moths of North America
Moths described in 1864